Mauritz Albertus van den Berg  (9 May 1909 – 9 April 1948) was a South African rugby union player.

Playing career
He then played all three test matches in the test series victory against .

Test history

See also
List of South Africa national rugby union players – Springbok no. 258

References

1909 births
1948 deaths
South African rugby union players
South Africa international rugby union players
Rugby union players from Pretoria
Rugby union locks
Western Province (rugby union) players